The South African Railways Class 6E1, Series 6 of 1976 was an electric locomotive.

In 1976 and 1977, the South African Railways placed one hundred Class 6E1,  electric locomotives with a Bo-Bo wheel arrangement in mainline service.

Manufacturer
The 3 kV DC Class 6E1, Series 6 electric locomotive was designed and built for the South African Railways (SAR) by Union Carriage & Wagon (UCW) in Nigel, Transvaal. The electrical equipment was supplied by the General Electric Company (GEC).

One hundred units were delivered in 1976 and 1977, numbered in the range from E1646 to E1745. Unlike Series 1 to 5 units which were all equipped with four AEI-283AZ axle-hung traction motors, the Series 6 units were equipped with AEI-283AY traction motors. UCW did not allocate builder’s numbers to the locomotives it built for the SAR and used the SAR unit numbers for their record keeping.

Characteristics

Orientation
These dual cab locomotives had a roof access ladder on one side only, just to the right of the cab access door. The roof access ladder end was marked as the no. 2 end. A corridor along the centre of the locomotive connected the cabs, which were identical apart from the fact that the handbrake was located in cab 2. A pantograph hook stick was stowed in a tube mounted below the lower edge of the locomotive body on the roof access ladder side. The locomotives had one square and two rectangular access panels along the lower half of the body on the roof access ladder side, and only one square access panel on the opposite side.

Series identifying features

The Class 6E1 was produced in eleven series over a period of nearly sixteen years. While some Class 6E1 series are visually indistinguishable from their predecessors or successors, some externally visible changes did occur over the years.

The Series 6 and Series 7 locomotives are visually indistinguishable from each other, but can be distinguished from all the older series models by the rainwater beading that had been added above the small grilles on the sides aft of the side doors.

Service
The Class 6E1 family saw service all over both 3 kV DC mainline and branch line networks, the smaller Cape Western mainline between Cape Town and Beaufort West and the larger network which covers portions of the Northern Cape, the Free State, Natal, Gauteng, North West and Mpumalanga.

Reclassification and rebuilding

Reclassification to Class 16E

During 1990 and 1991, Spoornet semi-permanently coupled several pairs of otherwise largely unmodified Class 6E1 units, reclassified them to Class 16E and allocated a single locomotive number to each pair, with the individual units in the pairs inscribed "A" or "B". The aim was to accomplish savings on cab maintenance by coupling the units at their no. 1 ends, abandoning the no. 1 end cabs in terms of maintenance and using only the no. 2 end cabs. Most pairs were later either disbanded with the units reverting to Class 6E1 and regaining their original numbers or rebuilt to Class 18E.

Eleven known Series 6 locomotives were part of such Class 16E pairs.
 E1653 became 16-420A.
 E1699 and E1700 became 16-425 A and B.
 E1669 and E1709 became 16-422 A and B.
 E1684 and E1701 became 16-427 A and B.
 E1718 and E1720 became 16-428 A and B.
 E1679 and E1714 became 16-429 A and B.

Rebuilding to Class 18E

Beginning in 2000, Spoornet began a project to rebuild Series 2 to 11 Class 6E1 locomotives to Class 18E, Series 1 and Series 2 at the Transnet Rail Engineering workshops at Koedoespoort. In the process the cab at the no. 1 end was stripped of all controls and the driver's front and side windows were blanked off to have a toilet installed, thereby forfeiting the locomotive's bi-directional ability.

Since the driving cab's noise level had to be below 85 decibels, cab 2 was selected as the Class 18E driving cab primarily based on its lower noise level compared to cab 1, which is closer and more exposed to the compressor's noise and vibration. Another factor was the closer proximity of cab 2 to the low voltage switch panel. The fact that the handbrake was located in cab 2 was not a deciding factor, but was considered an additional benefit.

The known Class 6E1, Series 6 units which were used in this project were rebuilt to Class 18E, Series 1 as well as Series 2 locomotives. Their numbers and renumbering details are listed in the table. This list is virtually complete with only one unknown remaining, the status of no. E1744 to 18-832 which is shown as “uncompleted” and of which the existence still need to be confirmed by sighting or photographic evidence. The Class 18E rebuilding program was terminated abruptly in late 2014 with about half a dozen units in various stages of completion on the rebuilding line. Some reports indicated that the incomplete units would be forwarded to Danskraal or Durban for completion, but it could not be confirmed that this actually took place.

Liveries
The whole series was delivered in the SAR Gulf Red livery with signal red cowcatchers, yellow whiskers and with the number plates on the sides mounted on three-stripe yellow wings. In the 1990s many of the Series 6 units began to be repainted in the Spoornet orange livery with a yellow and blue chevron pattern on the cowcatchers. Several later received the Spoornet maroon livery. In the Passenger Rail Agency of South Africa (PRASA) era after 2008, at least three were repainted in the Shosholoza Meyl purple livery and one in the PRASA light blue livery.

Illustration

References

External links

Bo-Bo locomotives
Cape gauge railway locomotives
2920
Railway locomotives introduced in 1976
Union Carriage & Wagon locomotives
3000 V DC locomotives